Samuel Johnson Poe was an American football halfback for the Princeton Tigers in 1882 and 1883. He graduated from Princeton in 1884, he was also earned All-American honors as a lacrosse player. Samuel was the eldest member of the Poe brothers, six celebrated American football players at Princeton University from 1882 until 1901. They were sons of John P. Poe, Sr., an 1854 Princeton graduate himself and the Attorney General of Maryland from 1891 until 1895. They were also second cousins, twice removed, of the celebrated poet Edgar Allan Poe, who died in 1849.

Princeton Tigers football players
Poe family (United States)
19th-century players of American football